Charles Waddington may refer to:
 Charles Waddington (East India Company officer) (1796–1858), major-general Bombay engineers
 Charles Waddington (philosopher) (1819–1914), French philosopher and writer